Grace Verbeek (born 10 August 1958) is a Canadian middle-distance runner. She competed in the women's 800 metres at the 1984 Summer Olympics.

References

1958 births
Living people
Athletes (track and field) at the 1984 Summer Olympics
Canadian female middle-distance runners
Olympic track and field athletes of Canada
Place of birth missing (living people)